The Public Bodies Corrupt Practices Act 1889 (52 & 53 Vict. c.69) was an act of the Parliament of the United Kingdom of Great Britain and Ireland (as it was then). It was one of the Prevention of Corruption Acts 1889 to 1916, a collective title adopted in 1916.

The act made the active or passive bribery of a member, officer or servant of a public body a criminal offence.

Specifically, the act prohibited a person covered by the act, whether by himself, or in conjunction with any other person, from corruptly soliciting or receiving, or agreeing to receive, for himself, or any other person, any gift, loan, fee, reward or advantage whatever as an inducement to, or reward for, doing or forbearing to do anything in respect of any matter or transaction whatsoever, actual or proposed, in which the public body is concerned. A person may also not corruptly promise, or offer, any gift, loan, fee, reward, or advantage whatsoever, to any person, whether for the benefit of that person, or of another person, as an inducement to or reward for doing or forbearing to do anything in respect of any matter or transaction whatsoever, actual or proposed; in which the public body is concerned.

Offences under the act required the consent of the attorney general to proceed with a prosecution. In relation to offences created by the act, the burden of proof was on the defendant to show (on the balance of probabilities) that the money, gift, or other consideration was not received corruptly.

In March 2006, the Metropolitan Police confirmed that, following complaints by the Scottish National Party and others, they were investigating possible breaches of the act. A total of £14 million in loans was given by wealthy individuals to Labour during the 2005 general election campaign and four of these men were subsequently nominated for Life Peerages. (See main article Cash for Peerages.)

Section 3 was repealed by the Criminal Justice Act 1988 and the entire act was repealed by the coming into force of the Bribery Act 2010.

See also
Prevention of Corruption Act

References

References
The Public Bodies Corrupt Practices Act 1889, as amended and in force today, from the Office of Public Sector Information.
List of amendments to this Act in the Republic of Ireland, from the Irish Statute Book.

United Kingdom Acts of Parliament 1889
Corruption in the United Kingdom